The Illinois Loop is an organization of parents, teachers, school board members, and others working to restore academic substance and effective teaching methods into schools.

The Illinois Loop started informally in about 1995, when a group of parents and teachers in the west suburbs of Chicago shared their concerns and opinions about what they perceived as dangerous trends in reading and math instruction in their schools.  Using online message boards, and later the Internet, they shared news, tips and discoveries to better prepare for their efforts in their own schools.
	
Since then, the Illinois Loop has helped thousands of parents, teachers and school board members better understand the nature, the promise and the risks associated with promoted innovations in education.

Today, hundreds of people receive updates from the Illinois Loop's email news list. Participants include teachers, board members, nationally known education experts, and many parents.  While a principal focus is on education in Illinois, much of the group's activities and information is applicable throughout the United States.

Areas of particular concern to the Illinois Loop include expansion of whole language to the detriment of reading skills, adoption by schools of so-called fuzzy math programs instead of  mastery-based math programs, reduction of the role of the teacher as an instructor, and overall lessening of substance and factual content in courses such as history, literature, geography, grammar and  science.

Issues

Some supporters of constructivist approaches in education accuse the Illinois Loop of being a "conservative political organization".  The group is highly apolitical, does not get involved in political issues, and has leaders and members who are Democrats, Republicans, liberals, conservatives and libertarians. 

Other criticisms:  "Illinois Loop does not support the concept of differentiation" (wrong, it does), "or changing instruction methods to support the learning style of particular students" (also wrong, since the Illinois Loop is highly supportive of finding the best environment for individual children).

References

External links
http://www.illinoisloop.org/ Illinois Loop website, providing information on individual subjects, teaching methods, issues regarding teaching, and the operation and management of schools.

Education reform
Standards-based education